John Irby Rogers III (born October 2, 1937) is a former American politician in the state of South Carolina. He served in the South Carolina House of Representatives as a member of the Democratic Party from 1972 to 1991. He is an attorney. He served a stint as speaker pro tempore of the House.

In 1991, Rogers was indicted as a result of an FBI corruption sting operation entitled Operation Lost Trust. He pleaded guilty to a charge of racketeering in 1991 and was sentenced to 45 months in prison.

References

1937 births
Living people
People from Bennettsville, South Carolina
South Carolina lawyers
Democratic Party members of the South Carolina House of Representatives